Yfke Sturm (born 19 November 1981) is a Dutch model.

Life and career
Sturm was born on 19 November 1981 in Almere, Flevoland. She was discovered in 1997 in Almere, by an Elite Model Management scout. Shortly thereafter, she entered the Dutch Elite Model Look Contest. Winning this contest was followed by winning the 1997 International Elite Model Look Contest in Nice, France. Sturm was 15 years old at the time. After her win, she signed exclusive contracts with Ralph Lauren and Calvin Klein. She has also modelled for Victoria's Secret.

TV host
In 2006, Sturm became the host of Holland's Next Top Model, the Dutch version of America's Next Top Model, which is shown on prime-time TV and is popular.  After the second season of HNTM, she decided to focus on her career as a model, as it was difficult to combine the TV work with her successful modeling career. In 2011 she made a guest appearance on Holland's Next Top Model. In December 2016 she started working for Fox Netherlands as a presenter, starting with the Victoria's Secret Fashion Show 2016, where she took backstage interviews.

Yfke's Model Secrets
Sturm is the co-author of the 2009 book Yfke's Model Secrets. It includes tips about exercise and diet and stories about the modeling industry.

Private life
Sturm was married to businessman Imad Izemrane from 2007 to 2010, when the couple divorced. She previously lived in New York, and later moved to London. In 2015 she had a son.

In September 2015 Sturm was seriously injured when she fell off a surf jet off the island of Ischia and was sailed over by a boat. She was airlifted to the nearest hospital with a fractured skull and spinal fractures, and was placed in a medically induced coma.

Bibliography 
 (2009) Yfke's Model Secrets with Martĳn van Stuyvenberg

References

External links 

Yfke Sturm, official website

Profile at IMG Models

1981 births
Dutch female models
Living people
People from Almere